In enzymology, a beta-glucogallin-tetrakisgalloylglucose O-galloyltransferase is an enzyme that catalyzes the chemical reaction.

1-O-galloyl-beta-D-glucose + 1,2,3,6-tetrakis-O-galloyl-beta-D-glucose  D-glucose + 1,2,3,4,6-pentakis-O-galloyl-beta-D-glucose

Thus, the two substrates of this enzyme are 1-O-galloyl-beta-D-glucose and 1,2,3,6-tetrakis-O-galloyl-beta-D-glucose, whereas its two products are D-glucose and 1,2,3,4,6-pentakis-O-galloyl-beta-D-glucose.

This enzyme belongs to the family of transferases, specifically those acyltransferases transferring groups other than aminoacyl groups.  The systematic name of this enzyme class is 1-O-galloyl-beta-D-glucose:1,2,3,6-tetrakis-O-galloyl-beta-D-glucose 4-O-galloyltransferase. Other names in common use include beta-glucogallin-tetragalloylglucose 4-galloyltransferase, beta-glucogallin:1,2,3,6-tetra-O-galloylglucose, 4-O-galloyltransferase, beta-glucogallin:1,2,3,6-tetra-O-galloyl-beta-D-glucose, and 4-O-galloyltransferase.

References

 

EC 2.3.1
Enzymes of unknown structure